Trainspotting may refer to:

 Trainspotting (hobby), an amateur interest in railways/railroads 
 Trainspotting (novel), a 1993 novel by Irvine Welsh
 Trainspotting (film), a 1996 film based on the novel
 Trainspotting (soundtrack), two soundtrack albums from the film
 T2 Trainspotting, a 2017 sequel to the 1996 film
 "Trainspotting", a song by Primal Scream from their 1997 album Vanishing Point
 Trainspotting, a video game for the Comx-35 home computer